Kakimoto Hideo, also known as Horihide, was a Japanese tattoo artist.

American tattoo artist Ed Hardy worked alongside Horihide in 1973.

See also
 Horimono

References

Japanese tattoo artists
1929 births
2017 deaths